Tuyehdarvar Rural District is a rural district (dehestan) in Amirabad District, Damghan County, Semnan Province, Iran. At the 2006 census, its population was 1,563, in 542 families.  The rural district has 7 villages.

References 

Rural Districts of Semnan Province
Damghan County